Žaklina Šojić is a Danish beauty pageant titleholder of Serb descent, who was crowned Miss Universe Danmark 2007 and represented Denmark at Miss Universe 2007 in Mexico City, Mexico.

Early life
Žaklina is working as a model in Denmark.

Pretty Danish 2007
Žaklina was crowned Miss Universe Denmark 2007. She competed at Miss Universe 2007 in Mexico. She entered the "Top 15" and finished in 13th place.

References

External links
Official Miss Danmark Organizations website

Danish beauty pageant winners
Danish female models
Living people
Miss Universe 2007 contestants
People from Copenhagen
Year of birth missing (living people)
Danish people of Serbian descent